The 2017 Football Queensland season was the fifth season since NPL Queensland commenced as the top tier of Queensland men’s football. Below NPL Queensland was a regional structure of ten zones with their own leagues. The strongest of the zones was Football Brisbane with its senior men’s competition consisting of five divisions.

The NPL Queensland premiers qualified for the National Premier Leagues finals series, competing with the other state federation champions in a final knockout tournament to decide the National Premier Leagues Champion for 2017.

On 8 December 2016 Football Queensland announced the commencement in 2018 of a 14 team second competition beneath a 14 team NPL Queensland, with promotion and relegation between the two tiers. The 28 clubs selected to participate in NPL Queensland and the FQPL were initially announced on 29 May 2017. The final list of clubs offered licences was made of 3 August 2017, with 12 clubs from Football Brisbane competitions (10 BPL and 2 CL1) to join the Football Queensland leagues in 2018. As a result, on 4 August 2017 Football Brisbane announced the restructure of its men's league for the 2018 season, with most clubs effectively moving up one division.

Men's League Tables

2017 National Premier League Queensland

The National Premier League Queensland 2017 season was played over 22 matches, followed by a finals series.

Finals

2017 Brisbane Premier League

The 2017 Brisbane Premier League was the 35th edition of the Brisbane Premier League which has been a second level domestic association football competition in Queensland since the Queensland State League was formed in 2008.

Finals

2017 Capital League 1

The 2017 Capital League 1 season was the fifth edition of the Capital League 1 as the third level domestic football competition in Queensland. 12 teams competed, all playing each other twice for a total of 22 matches. Relegated teams will be part of the 2018 Capital League 1 season, which will be the fourth level domestic competition in Queensland.

Finals

2017 Capital League 2

The 2017 Capital League 2 season was the fifth edition of the Capital League 2 as the fourth level domestic football competition in Queensland. 12 teams competed, all playing each other twice for a total of 22 matches. Relegated teams will be part of the 2018 Capital League 2 season, which will be the fifth level domestic competition in Queensland.

Finals

2017 Capital League 3

The 2017 Capital League 3 season was the fifth edition of the Capital League 3 as the fifth level domestic football competition in Queensland. 12 teams competed, all playing each other twice for a total of 22 matches. Relegated teams will be part of the 2018 Capital League 3 season, which will be the sixth level domestic competition in Queensland.

Finals

2017 Capital League 4

The 2017 Capital League 4 season was the fifth edition of the Capital League 4 as the sixth level domestic football competition in Queensland. Nine teams competed, all playing each other twice for a total of 16 matches.

Finals

Women's League Tables

2017 Women's NPL Queensland

The 2017 Women's NPL Queensland season was the third edition of the Women's NPL Queensland as the top level domestic football of women's competition in Queensland. 10 teams competed, all playing each other twice for a total of 18 matches.

Finals

Cup Competitions

2017 Canale Cup

Brisbane-based soccer clubs competed in 2017 for the Canale Cup, known for sponsorship reasons as the 2017 Pig 'N' Whistle Canale Cup. Clubs entered from the Brisbane Premier League, the Capital League 1, Capital League 2 and Capital League 3. The early rounds of the competition were linked to the qualifying competition for the 2017 FFA Cup, where losing teams from successive rounds of the FFA Cup Preliminary rounds entered in following rounds of the Canale Cup.

This knockout competition was won by Peninsula Power.

FFA Cup Qualifiers

Queensland-based soccer clubs competed in 2017 in the Preliminary rounds for the 2017 FFA Cup. The four winners of Seventh Round qualified for the final rounds of the FFA Cup; Far North Queensland FC (representing North Queensland), Gold Coast City (representing South Queensland), with Moreton Bay United and Peninsula Power representing Brisbane. In addition, A-League club Brisbane Roar qualified for the final rounds, entering at the Round of 32.

References

2017 in Australian soccer
Football Queensland seasons